The Elkhead Limestone is a geologic formation in Idaho. It preserves fossils dating back to the Cambrian period.

See also

 List of fossiliferous stratigraphic units in Idaho
 Paleontology in Idaho

References
 

Cambrian Idaho